Cristian Daniel "Chicho" Arango Duque (born 9 March 1995) is a Colombian professional footballer who plays as a forward for Liga MX club Pachuca.

Club career

Early career 
Arango began his professional career with Envigado in 2012, aged 17. For the 2015–16 season, he was loaned out to Valencia B, Valencia's reserve team in the third division, where he scored eight goals in 26 games. At the end of the season, he returned to Envigado to play the 2016 Finalizacion season, where he played in all 20 games, scoring four goals.

In January 2017, his move to Millonarios was made official. He played with them in the 2017 Apertura and the 2017 Copa Libertadores, and although he did not get much playing time due to injuries, his performance interested many European clubs.

Portugal 
On 28 June 2017, he was confirmed as a Benfica player, signing a five-year contract After playing the preseason with the club, the board decided to send him on loan. In August 2017, Desportivo Aves signed him on a one-year loan. On 10 January 2018, he scored two important goals in a match against Rio Ave; first, he scored in the last minute of the game to tie the score at 3-3 and send the game into extra time. He added another in extra time, and scored his penalty in the shootout to help his club qualify to the semi-finals of the Taça de Portugal. Aves later won the cup, defeating Sporting CP in the final, although Arango did not play.

In August 2018, he was loaned out again, this time to Tondela.

Return to Millonarios 
On 10 July 2019, Arango returned to Millonarios, signing a three-year contract.

Los Angeles FC
On 2 August 2021, Arango joined Major League Soccer club Los Angeles FC. Arango made an immediate impact, scoring 14 goals in 17 league matches, and was named Newcomer of the Year.

International career
On 16 November 2021, Arango made his senior national team debut in a World Cup qualifier against Paraguay.

Honours
Aves
Taça de Portugal: 2017–18

Los Angeles FC
MLS Cup: 2022
Supporters' Shield: 2022

Individual
MLS Newcomer of the Year: 2021

References

External links
 
 

1995 births
Living people
Footballers from Medellín
Association football forwards
Colombian footballers
Colombia international footballers
Colombian expatriate footballers
Envigado F.C. players
Valencia CF Mestalla footballers
Millonarios F.C. players
S.L. Benfica footballers
C.D. Aves players
C.D. Tondela players
Los Angeles FC players
Segunda División B players
Categoría Primera A players
Primeira Liga players
Expatriate footballers in Portugal
Expatriate footballers in Spain
Expatriate soccer players in the United States
Colombian expatriate sportspeople in Portugal
Colombian expatriate sportspeople in Spain
Colombian expatriate sportspeople in the United States
Major League Soccer players
21st-century Colombian people